Hex River Pass is a pass on the N1 national road, between De Doorns and Touws River in the Western Cape province of South Africa.

See also
 Hex River Mountains
 Hex River Tunnels

Mountain passes of the Western Cape
N1 (South Africa)